ASPC may refer to:

 Alejandro Silva (musician)
 Archive for Small Press & Communication
 Associated Students of Pomona College